Pry is an interactive shell for the Ruby programming language. It is notable for its Smalltalk-inspired ability to start a REPL within a running program. This lets programmers debug and modify the current state of a system.

Features

Pry exposes most of its introspective capabilities using a filesystem metaphor. For example, it has a cd command to start interacting with a particular object, and uses ls to list methods and variables.

It is possible to start Pry at any point inside a running program. Due to the reflective nature of Ruby, this lets the programmer inspect the program, change its current state, or correct the source code without restarting the process.

A number of third party plugins are available for Pry, these add tighter integration with other Ruby projects, enhance the abilities of Pry itself, and make Pry available over a remote connection.

See also

 Comparison of computer shells
 IPython — A similar piece of software for the Python programming language
 SLIME — An interactive Lisp shell for Emacs
 Tweak — A Smalltalk programming environment

References

External links
 
 Wiki documentation
 Introductory video

Ruby (programming language)
Interpreters (computing)